The Pátzcuaro chub (Algansea lacustris) is a species of freshwater fish in the family Cyprinidae. It is endemic to Lake Pátzcuaro and nearby waters (part of the upper Lerma River basin) in west-central Mexico. This is a relatively large Algansea, reaching a size similar to the popoche chub.

References

Algansea
Freshwater fish of Mexico
Endemic fish of Mexico
Fish described in 1895